Jim Mitchell may refer to:
 Jim Mitchell (Australian footballer) (1920–1996), Australian footballer for Melbourne
 Jim Mitchell (cartoonist) (born 1949), underground cartoonist from Milwaukee
 Jim Mitchell (defensive lineman) (born 1948), American football player for the Detroit Lions
 Jim Mitchell (politician) (1946–2002), Irish Fine Gael politician
 Jim Mitchell (tight end) (1947–2007), professional American football player for the Atlanta Falcons
 Jim Mitchell (visual effects artist), American visual effects artist
 Jim Mitchell (1943–2007), San Francisco pornography producer who killed his brother Artie, see Mitchell brothers
 James Mitchell (footballer, born 1897) (1897–1975), commonly known as Jim Mitchell, English international footballer
 James Mitchell (manager) (born 1965), also known as Jim Mitchell, American professional wrestling manager
 James G. Mitchell (born 1943), commonly known as Jim Mitchell, Canadian computer scientist

See also
James Mitchell (disambiguation)